The 1993–94 Boston Bruins season was the Bruins' 70th season. The season involved Cam Neely scoring 50 goals in 44 games, however, the Bruins had already played 66 games; making this an unofficial record.

The Bruins reached the second round in the Stanley Cup playoffs, beating the Montreal Canadiens before losing to the New Jersey Devils.

Offseason

NHL Draft
Boston's draft picks at the 1993 NHL Entry Draft held at the Quebec Coliseum in Quebec City, Quebec.

Notes
 The Bruins acquired this pick as the result of a trade on January 2, 1992, that sent Garry Galley, Wes Walz and a third-round pick in 1993 to Philadelphia in exchange for Gord Murphy, Brian Dobbin, a third-round pick in 1992 and this pick.
 The Bruins third-round pick went to the Philadelphia Flyers as the result of a trade on January 2, 1992, that sent Gord Murphy, Brian Dobbin, a third-round pick in 1992 and a fourth-round pick in 1993 to Boston in exchange for Garry Galley, Wes Walz and this pick (77th overall).
 The Bruins eleventh-round pick went to the Winnipeg Jets as the result of a trade on February 21, 1993, that sent Troy Murray to Chicago in exchange for Steve Bancroft and this pick (285th overall).
Chicago previously acquired this pick as the result of a trade on January 8, 1992 that sent an eleventh-round pick in 1992 to Boston in exchange for Steve Bancroft and this pick.

Regular season
The Bruins had 2,980 shots on goal during the regular season, second only to the Detroit Red Wings. They tied the Buffalo Sabres and Tampa Bay Lightning for the fewest power-play goals against (58). On Sunday, March 27, 1994, the Bruins scored three short-handed goals in a 6–4 win over the Washington Capitals.

Final standings

Playoffs
In the Conference Quarter-Finals the Bruins met the defending champion Montreal Canadiens led by goalie Patrick Roy. The Bruins finished the season one point ahead of the Canadiens but had a losing 1–2–2 record over the season series between the two teams. The opening round playoff series was back and forth with the Canadiens holding a 3–2 series lead by Game 5. The Bruins rallied and won the last two games of the series in order to advance to the next round. This was the last time the Bruins reached at least the second round until the 1998–99 season.

In the second round Eastern Conference semifinal series the Bruins were matched with the New Jersey Devils, who under the eventual  93–94 coach of the year winner, Jacques Lemaire, implemented the neutral zone trap. The Bruins jumped ahead to a 2–0 series lead by taking the opening two games. However the Devils rebounded and eliminated the Bruins, winning the next four games straight.

The Bruins were without forward and leading scorer Cam Neely due to a knee injury. Their top scorer in the playoffs was center Adam Oates with 12 points (3 goals, 9 assists).

Schedule and results

Player statistics

Skaters

Goaltending

† Denotes player spent time with another team before joining the Bruins. Stats reflect time with the Bruins only.
‡ Denotes player was traded mid-season. Stats reflect time with the Bruins only.

Awards and honors
James Norris Trophy 
 Ray Bourque

References
 Bruins on Hockey Database

Boston Bruins seasons
Boston Bruins
Boston Bruins
Boston Bruins
Boston Bruins
Bruins
Bruins